Giovanni Tacci Porcelli known as Giovanni Tacci (12 November 1863 – 30 June 1928) was an Italian prelate of the Catholic Church who was Bishop of Città della Pieve for twenty years, then a papal ambassador, and finally secretary of the Congregation for the Oriental Churches from 1922 to 1927. He was made a cardinal in 1921.

Biography
Giovanni Tacci Porcelli was born in Mogliano to Professor Luigi Tacci and Maria Monti Guarnieri. He studied at the seminary in Tolentino and earned doctorates in theology and canon law at the Pontifical Roman Seminary. To prepare for a career in the diplomatic service he attended the Pontifical Ecclesiastical Academy. He was ordained a priest on 19 September 1886. He then did pastoral work in Fermo and Rome until 1895 and was raised to the rank of domestic chamberlain of his holiness. He also served as dean of the Pontifical Ecclesiastical Academy, a member of the Commission of Pontifical Schools, and an ecclesiasticus of several monasteries.

On 18 March 1895, he was appointed Bishop of Città della Pieve by Pope Leo XIII. He received his episcopal consecration on 5 May from Cardinal Amilcare Malagola.

He was named apostolic delegate to Constantinople and patriarchal vicar for Latin-rite Catholics there on 19 December 1904, after being named Titular Archbishop of Nicaea. He was appointed nuncio to Belgium on 31 December 1907 and then internuncio to the Netherlands on 18 March 1911.

He was appointed majordomo of his holiness on 8 December 2016 and his diplomatic career ended when he was appointed prefect of the Pontifical Household on 30 October 1918.

Pope Benedict XV made him Cardinal-Priest of Santa Maria in Trastevere in the consistory of 13 June 1921. He was one of the cardinal electors who participated in the 1922 papal conclave, which elected Pope Pius XI; erroneous news from Rome reported that Tacci himself had been elected.

Pope Pius named him secretary of the Congregation for the Oriental Churches on 8 August 1922, in effect its head since until 1967 the pope reserved the title of prefect of that congregation to himself. On 17 September he was made a member of the Congregation for the Doctrine of the Faith and on 24 November of the Pontifical Commission for the Interpretation of the Code of Canon Law. He resigned his post as secretary on 29 January 1927 for health reasons.

He died in Rome on 30 June 1928 at the age of 64 and was buried in the Campo Verano cemetery.

See also
Cardinals created by Benedict XV

Notes

References

External links
Cardinals of the Holy Roman Church 
Catholic-Hierarchy 

1863 births
1927 deaths
20th-century Italian cardinals
Apostolic Nuncios to Belgium
Apostolic Nuncios to the Netherlands
Officials of the Roman Curia
Prefects of the Papal Household
Members of the Congregation for the Oriental Churches
Pontifical Ecclesiastical Academy alumni
Pontifical Roman Seminary alumni